Bruno Bonaldi (17 September 1944 – 7 July 2016) was an Italian ski mountaineer and cross-country skiing amateur of the ASC Ladinia Alta Badia.

Together with Angelo Genuin and Luigi Weiss, he placed first in the military team category in the 1975 Trofeo Mezzalama edition, which was carried out as the first World Championship of Skimountaineering.

Bonaldi died on 7 July 2016 at the age of 71

References 

1944 births
2016 deaths
Italian male ski mountaineers
World ski mountaineering champions
Italian military patrol (sport) runners